Stay in Touch is the tenth studio album by German singer Sandra, released on 26 October 2012 by Virgin Records.

Background
The album was produced by a German DJ duo Blank & Jones and most of the songs were written or co-written by Jens Gad. The material incorporated 1980s style into songs, reproducing the sound pattern of Sandra's early albums, with the track "Kings & Queens" sampling her 1985 song "(I'll Never Be) Maria Magdalena". It was also the first album since 1988's Into a Secret Land to feature Hubert Kemmler as a songwriter and background vocalist.

"Maybe Tonight" was released as the first single in May 2012 and charted at number 77 in Germany. The second and final single was "Infinite Kiss", accompanied by a music video filmed largely at a concert in Warsaw, Poland in September 2012. Sandra's look in the video was partly inspired by the novel Fifty Shades of Grey which the singer admitted is a fan of. The music video premiered on 23 October 2012. "Infinite Kiss" was released as a digital maxi single in November 2012 and failed to chart. It included an exclusive track "Russian Eyes", otherwise available solely on Russian and Ukrainian editions of the album.

Stay in Touch was released on 26 October 2012 in both standard format and a double-disc deluxe edition featuring extended versions of songs. The album reached the top 20 in Sandra's native Germany and the top 40 in the Czech Republic.

Track listing

Charts

References

2012 albums
Sandra (singer) albums
Virgin Records albums